Stojnci is a settlement in the Municipality of Markovci in northeastern Slovenia. It was first mentioned in written documents dating to 1286 as Stoyndorf. The area is part of the traditional region of Styria. It is now included with the rest of the municipality in the Drava Statistical Region.

References

External links
Stojnci on Geopedia

Populated places in the Municipality of Markovci